Salarias segmentatus is a species of combtooth blenny from the Western Central Pacific. It occasionally makes its way into the aquarium trade.  This species reaches a length of  TL.

References

External links
 

segmentatus
Taxa named by Hans Bath
Taxa named by John Ernest Randall
Fish described in 1991